Willis K. Long (born May 19, 1930) is an American former politician. He served as a Democratic member of the Georgia House of Representatives for the 142nd district .

Long was born in Decatur County, Georgia. He attended Norman College. He then served in the United States Navy from 1948 to 1952. In 1975, Long was elected to represent the 142nd district of the Georgia House of Representatives. He served until the 1990s.

References 

1930 births
Living people
People from Decatur County, Georgia
Democratic Party members of the Georgia House of Representatives
20th-century American politicians